Melodifestivalen 2009 was a Swedish song contest held between February and March 2009. It was the selection for the 49th song to represent Sweden in the Eurovision Song Contest, and was the 48th edition of Melodifestivalen. Five heats were held in the Swedish cities of Gothenburg, Skellefteå, Leksand and Malmö, with Norrköping hosting the final Andra Chansen round.

After the five heats 11 songs had qualified to the final of the contest, contested in the Swedish capital of Stockholm, at the Globe Arena. After the voting of 12 juries and a public televote had been revealed, the final winner was opera singer Malena Ernman with pop/opera song "La Voix", which received top marks from the public televote, despite only placing eighth after the votes of the 12 juries.

The 2009 edition of Melodifestivalen implemented a number of new rules which changed the dynamics of the contest, including an increase in the number of people allowed on stage, the allowance of pre-recorded backing vocals, and a new international jury who selected an eleventh finalist, and voted in the final.

Rules

The current rules for Melodifestivalen were first implemented in 2002 – the format consists of five heats held every year: the first four heats each consist of eight songs, in which the top two songs directly qualify to the final of the contest, while the third and fourth-placed songs qualify to the final heat, the Andra Chansen (Second Chance) round. Eight songs compete in the Second Chance round, competing in a knock-out format until two songs are left, which qualify to the final. These songs are chosen by a public televote held on the night of the contest. The final consisted of 10 songs, who are awarded marks by 11 regional juries of Sweden, alongside televoting, with each constituting 50% of the total result.

28 songs are selected from a public call for songs by SVT. These are chosen from a large number of entries, with over 3000 entries being received by SVT in past contests. These songs are reduced by the Swedish Music Publishers Association (Svenska musikförläggareföreningen; SMFF), who reduce this large number to around 1200 entries. A sixteen-person jury reduce this number once again to the final 28 competing songs. These 28 songs are then joined by compositions by four songwriters invited by SVT, who each submit a song into the competition.

For the 2009 contest a number of changes were implemented to this format: the first four heats now include a duel format, with the top four songs competing against each other for a place in the final - the 1st and 4th-placed songs and the 2nd and 3rd-placed songs battled against each other, with the winning songs, as decided by another public televote, qualifying to the final, while the losing songs take part in the Second Chance round.

For the 2009 contest a maximum of eight people were allowed on stage, an increase from the previous maximum of six. As well as this pre-recorded backing vocals were now allowed to be included on the songs' backing tracks, however the main vocals were still required to be performed on stage.

This year also marked the introduction of an "international jury". The jury consists of 12 members, who all work within the music industry, with many involved in Eurovision. The international jury selected one song from each heat that did not qualify to the final, focusing their decision on their suitability for Eurovision. After the Second Chance round had finished, the jury selected their preferred song from the remaining entries, which qualified to the final, becoming the 11th finalist. The international jury also voted during the final of the contest, becoming the 12th jury, alongside the 11 regional juries of Sweden.

Details

On 11 September 2008 the six cities that were to host Melodifestivlan 2009 were announced: the first heat would be held in Sweden's second city, Gothenburg – at the Scandinavium; this was followed by heats in the Skellefteå Kraft Arena, the Ejendals Arena in the small town of Leksand, and in the newly constructed Malmö Arena in Malmö. The Second Chance round was in the Himmelstalundshallen in Norrköping, while the grand final would once again be held at Globen in Stockholm.

The dates for the contest were also announced, with the first heat being held on 7 February, leading up to the final on 14 March 2009 over six weeks.

After two years of hosting the contest, it was announced that Kristian Luuk would not be hosting the 2009 edition of Melodifestivalen. He was replaced by comedian Petra Mede, who was announced at the new host in a press conference by SVT on 18 December.

Schedule

Visual design

The logo for the Contest, the now-familiar five spotlights, has not been altered since its interception in 2002, and remained in use for the 2009 Contest. The first details of the stage for this year's contest were released on 29 January 2009, a week before the first heat in Gothenburg. The first plans of the stage were made during the summer of 2008 and was, for the third time, designed by Viktor Brattström, with the intention to provide a feeling of endlessness: "The audience will get the feeling of not knowing where the stage starts or ends, not knowing what's coming up around the corner".

The green room, where the artists rested after their performances, was altered from previous contests. Instead of competing artists and composers sitting together at tables, artists sat together on sofas beside the stage, while composers sat together in the front rows of the audience.

Entries
A record-breaking 3,440 songs were submitted to the competition, with only 28 proceeding to the next round. The final 28 songs chosen to compete in the heats were released by SVT on 14 October, along with the names of their authors. The names of the performers were held back, and were released in groups over the following weeks. However this did not stop speculation on who would perform certain songs in the heat.

The first eight participants were revealed on 18 November 2009: they included former participants Alcazar, BWO, Måns Zelmerlöw, Lasse Lindh, Caroline af Ugglas and Sarah Dawn Finer, as well as debuting artists Emilia and Jennifer Brown.

On 23 November, the tenth act was revealed by Melodifestivalen producer Christer Björkman on the reality TV show Dansbandkampen. The Scotts, a participant on the show, was revealed to have been selected to compete in Melodifestivalen 2009 with "Jag tror på oss". SVT followed by releasing the next group of competing artists, all of whom had never competed in Melodifestivalen before: H.E.A.T, Jonathan Fagerlund, Maja Gullstrand, Mikael Rickfors, Molly Sandén, Next 3, and Rigo & The Topaz Sound feat. Red Fox were all announced to have been successful in their applying for Melodifestivalen.

Six more artists were revealed on 2 December by SVT's Culture News – Idol winner Agnes was announced to be making her debut to Melodifestivalen after being disqualified in 2007. The remaining artists announced were all making their returns to Melodifestivalen, including Shirley Clamp, Lili & Susie, Amy Diamond, Sofia and Velvet.

A day before the next group of artists were released by SVT it had been rumoured that two former Eurovision participants would compete in a duet – Estonia's 2002 participant  Sahlene, and Norway's 2008 participant, and current host of Norway's equivalent of Melodifestivalen, Melodi Grand Prix, Maria Haukaas Storeng. The following day, on 9 December, SVT confirmed the news, and also announced the names of four more artists: Susanne Alfvengren, the Thorleifs, Nina Söderquist and Cookies 'n Beans.

The final non-wild card entry to be announced was revealed on 16 December, with the Star Pilots performing "Higher" in the contest.

Wild cards
The wild card (joker) system was introduced in 2004 to diversify the music featured in the competition. Four artists, one in each semifinal, are invited by SVT to enter a song of their choice into the competition, provided it does not breach the rules.

In a change from previous years, the names of the wild card entries were released alongside the submitted entries instead of the usual method of releasing the wild cards after the other 28 entries. The first wild card entry was released on 19 November, with Melodifestivalen producer Christer Björkman, Jennifer Brown and Måns Zelmerlöw featuring on Godmorgon Sverige. They revealed that Finnish-Swedish singer Markoolio would enter Melodifestivalen with the song "Kärlekssång från mig".

The second wild card entry was announced on 26 November by SVT – opera singer Malena Ernman was confirmed to be participating in this year's contest with "La Voix", composed by herself and Fredrik Kempe, who also composed last year's winning entry "Hero". The third wild card was announced on 3 December, with Marie Serneholt, formerly of A*Teens, taking part with "Disconnect Me", written by Peter Boström and Tony Nilsson.

The final wild card entry was revealed on 16 December – boyband E.M.D., consisting of Erik Segerstedt, Mattias Andréasson and Danny Saucedo (all of them former Idol competitors) were announced as the last competitor, performing "Baby Goodbye", written by the band members and Oscar Görres.

Wild card entries

Heats
Each of the 32 songs were sorted into one heat on 11 December, with 8 songs each competing in a heat (including one wild card). However the final running order for the heat was conducted on 15 January – Nina Söderquist would open the first heat with "Tick Tock", while wild card Malena Ernman would close the final heat with "La Voix".

The four heats were held between 7 and 28 February, with the Second Chance round being held on 7 March.

Heat 1

The first heat was held on 7 February at the Scandinavium in Gothenburg.

The show began with host Petra Mede introducing the eight competing acts, with a number of skits being shown with former winners Charlotte Perrelli and Martin Stenmarck.

The first song on stage was Nina Söderquist with "Tick Tock", a powerful rock song. Söderquist performed in a black leather outfit, joined by four male backing dancers and two male backing singers, all in black. Fire was used frequently during the performance. Second on stage was Jonathan Fagerlund, performing "Welcome to My Life". Fagerlund, dressed in a grey top and jeans, was joined on stage by an all-female backing band for his performance of the light pop/rock song. Next on stage was Melodifestivalen 2004 runner-up Shirley Clamp, performing the first Swedish language song of the contest, "Med hjärtat fyllt av ljus". Clamp performed the ballad alone on stage, dressed in a long blue dress. The stage was also bathed in blue light, and wind machines were later used in the performance. The fourth act on stage was dansband the Scotts, performing "Jag tror på oss". The quartet, performing in black and silver suits, were joined by three female backing singers, dressed in short black dresses.

The fifth act on stage was Emilia, singing "You're My World", an up-tempo pop song with jazz elements. Emilia was dressed in a sparkling gold dress, joined on stage by four female backing singers, a pianist, drummer and bassist, all dressed in Big band era inspired outfits. Pyrotechnics were later used towards the end of the song. Next on stage was twice third-placers Alcazar, composed of Andreas Lundstedt, Tess Merkel and Lina Hedlund. Their song "Stay the Night", an energetic disco song, began with violet light shining on the band members, dressed in pink and blue. The group were joined by three backing dancers, with dancing featured throughout the song by the trio. The penultimate song was Caroline af Ugglas with "Snälla snälla", an emotional ballad. Caroline, dressed in a short white dress with bright blue wellies, gave an emotional performance, with anger and frustration prominent. Last on stage was the heats wild card entry, Marie Serneholt with "Disconnect Me". Serneholt performed the energetic pop song in a short white dress, joined by four male dancers, and later by two female backing singers, all in black.

After the first round of televoting was conducted Marie Serneholt, Jonathan Fagerlund and Shirley Clamp were all eliminated from the competition after receiving the fewest votes. They were joined by Nina Söderquist, after she received the fewest votes in the second round of voting. All of the remaining four acts progressed to the duels. In the duels Alcazar battled against the Scotts for a place in the final, with Alcazar getting more votes against the dansband. Caroline af Ugglas and Emilia also battled for direct qualification, with Emilia winning the place in the final.

A total of 3,294,000 watched the heat on SVT, with 721,334 votes cast during the heat, a record for the first heat of Melodifestivalen. Because of this, 1,396,108kr was donated to SVT's charity appeal Radiohjälpen.

Second round (Duels)

Heat 2
The second heat was held at the Skellefteå Kraft Arena in Skellefteå on 14 February.

The first act on stage was sisters Lili & Susie with "Show Me Heaven". The sisters performed the energetic pop song in white top and black trousers, and were joined on stage by a group of backing dancers/singers, all in black. Large white letters spelt out the title of the song on the backing LED screens, and pyrotechnics were used at the end of the song. Second on stage was Lasse Lindh och Bandet, performing "Jag ska slåss i dina kvarter!" (I'll be fighting in your neighbourhood!). Lindh performed the rock song with a backing band and a male backing singer in black. Next on stage was Jennifer Brown with "Never Been Here Before", an emotional pop/rock song. Brown, dressed in a silver top and black trousers, was joined on stage by three male violinists, two male trombonists and a male guitarist, who also performed backing vocals. The fourth act on stage was rock band H.E.A.T with "1000 Miles". The group performed in black, while the stage was brightened by pulsating light.

Fifth on stage was Markoolio, performing "Kärlekssång från mig", a comedic love ballad. Markoolio, dressed in a burgundy suit, was joined on stage by a pianist and a violinist, dressed in black. A man dressed as Elvis appeared from within the piano, dancing and skating on stage, before being set on fire by pyrotechnics at the climax at the song.  He was extinguished at the end of the song. Amy Diamond performed next, singing "It's My Life". Diamond performed the pop song in a silver jumper, and was accompanied by six female backing dancers in black and pink. Her jumper was removed to reveal a white and black top with black leggings. Large images of diamonds were shown on the screens while blue light shone down on stage. Cookies 'N' Beans were the second last act to take the stage, singing "What If", an emotional country ballad. The trio performed alone on stage, dressed in black, blue and red dresses. A guitar solo opened the song before going into the emotional performance of the trio. The last song of the night was "Hope & Glory", sung by Måns Zelmerlöw, who previously came third in 2007. The schlager song (with a boxing theme) was performed by Zelmerlöw in a black tuxedo, joined on stage by six female backing dancers/singers in black outfits.

Markoolio, Jennifer Brown and Lasse Lindh were all eliminated from the competition after receiving the fewest votes in the first round of televoting. In the second round, Cookies 'N' Beans were eliminated after received the fewest votes. The remaining four acts progressed to the duels.

In the duels H.E.A.T battled against Amy Diamond for the place in the final, with H.E.A.T winning the more votes. Zelmerlöw took on Lili & Susie for the place in the final as well, with Zelmerlöw winning over the sisters.

812,874 votes were cast for the second heat, a new record for any heat, with an increase of over 60,000 votes over last year's second heat. 1,269,806.50kr was donated to SVT's Radiohjälpen due to the large number of calls made on the night.

Second round (Duels)

Heat 3

The third heat was held on 21 February at the Ejendals Arena in Leksand.

The first act on stage was Velvet, performing "The Queen". Velvet begins the performance in a gigantic pink dress, which opens up to reveal seven backing dancers in Commedia dell'arte dress. The stage was filled with smoke and shone pink. Second on stage was Rigo & The Topaz Sound feat. Red Fox with "I Got U". The song mixes Motown with modern elements, with all on stage dressed as such, wearing red and white suits and dresses. The stage was filled to capacity, with two lead singers, a pianist, drummer, guitarist, saxophonist and two female backing singers. The next act on stage was Molly Sandén, who represented Sweden in the Junior Eurovision Song Contest in 2006 with "Det finaste någon kan få". At Melodifestivalen she performed "Så vill stjärnorna". The 16-year-old performed the emotional ballad alone on stage, dressed in an elegant white dress, while screens in the background showed shining stars. The fourth act on stage was boyband E.M.D., performing "Baby Goodbye". The boys performed the energetic pop song in black tuxedos, and were joined on stage by four male backing dancers, also in black tuxedos.

Next on stage was Mikael Rickfors with "Du vinner över mig!", a rock/pop song. Rickfors, dressed in a black and navy blue suit, was joined by an all-female backing band, dressed in black, while blue light filled the stage during the performance. Maja Gullstrand was next on stage, singing "Här för mig själv". Gullstrand performed in a short white dress, and joined on stage by a group of backing dancers in minimalistic black suits and dresses, while colourful bubbles were shown on the backing screens. The penultimate act of the night was Sofia with "Alla", an ethno pop song with rock elements, performed in Greek. Sofia, dressed in black, was joined on stage by two male violinists in black, as well as four women playing large transparent drums on stage, while the stage was filled with colourful light. The last act on stage was three-time participants BWO performing "You're Not Alone", a sentimental electric ballad. The band, consisting of Martin Rolinski on vocals and Alexander Bard and Marina Schiptjenko on keyboards, were dressed in futuristic space suits in grey and yellow. They were joined on stage by five backing dancers, also dressed in the same styles, using light skits during the performance. Images of comets passing through space were also shown on the backing screens.

Velvet, Sofia and Maja Gullstrand were knocked out after the first round of televoting, receiving the fewest votes. Mikael Rickfors joined them after the second round, also receiving the fewest votes. The four remaining acts passed through to the duels.

In the duels Rigo & The Topaz Sound feat. Red Fox battled E.M.D., with E.M.D. winning the more votes and progressing to the final. BWO took on  Molly Sandén for the place in the final as well, with Sandén coming out on top.

691,238 votes were cast for the third heat, with 1,053,643kr being donated to SVT's Radiohjälpen from the calls.
{| class="sortable wikitable" style="margin: 1em auto 1em auto; text-align:center;"
|-
! rowspan="2" | Draw
! rowspan="2" | Artist
! rowspan="2" | Song
! rowspan="2" |Songwriter(s)
! colspan="3" class="unsortable" | Votes
! rowspan="2" | Place
! rowspan="2" | Result
|-
!
!
!Total
|-
| 1
| align="left" |Velvet
| align="left" | "The Queen"
| align="left" |Tony Nilsson (m & l), Henrik Janson (m & l)
| 15,985
| —
|15,985
| 6
| align="left" | Out
|- style="font-weight:bold;background:gold;"
|2
| align="left" |Rigo & The Topaz Sound feat. Red Fox
| align="left" |"I Got U"
| align="left" |Rodrigo Pencheff (m & l), Tobias Karlsson (m)
|18,515
|38,078
|56,593
| 4
| align="left" | Second round
|- style="font-weight:bold;background:gold;"
|3
| align="left" |Molly Sandén
| align="left" || align="left" |Bobby Ljunggren (m), Marcos Ubeda (m), Ingela "Pling" Forsman (l)|29,523|55,713|85,236| 3
| align="left" |Second round
|- style="font-weight:bold;background:gold;"
|4| align="left" |E.M.D.| align="left" |"Baby Goodbye"| align="left" |Oscar Görres  (m & l)|65,234|127,990|193,224| 1
| align="left" | Second round
|-
| 5
| align="left" |Mikael Rickfors
| align="left" |
| align="left" |Thomas G:son (m & l)
| 17,785
| 36,284
|54,069
| 5
| align="left" | Out
|-
| 6
| align="left" |Maja Gullstrand
| align="left" |"Här för mig själv"
| align="left" |Thomas G:son (m & l), Marcos Ubeda (m & l)
| 10,568
| —
|10,568
| 8
| align="left" | Out
|- style="font-weight:bold;background:turquoise;"
|7
| align="left" |Sofia
| align="left" |"Alla" (Άλλα)
| align="left" |
|14,782
|—
|14,782
| 7
| align="left" | Wildcard
|- style="font-weight:bold;background:gold;"
|8
| align="left" |BWO
| align="left" |"You're Not Alone"
| align="left" |Fredrik Kempe (m & l), Alexander Bard (m & l), Anders Hansson (m & l)
|41,082
|80,414
|121,496
|2
| align="left" |Second round
|}

 Second round (Duels) 

Heat 4
The fourth and final heat was held on 28 February at the new Malmö Arena in Malmö.

First on stage was Agnes with "Love Love Love", a Europop song. Anges performed in a skin-tight gold outfit, and was joined on stage by six backing dancers in black and gold. Agnes began her performance on a lit catwalk, while a moving city skyline was shown on the backing screens. Confetti also fell towards the end of the song. The Star Pilots were next on stage with "Higher". The band were dressed as pilots, and in the background images of airplanes, runways and airplane wheels were shown. The third act on stage was Susanne Alfvengren with the emotional ballad "Du är älskad där du går". Alfvengren performed alone on stage, dressed in a long purple dress, while the stage was lighted by shining lights on the backing screens. Two former Eurovision artists were next on stage, with Anna Sahlene and Maria Haukaas Storeng pairing up to perform "Killing Me Tenderly". The duo, dressed in silver dresses, were joined by five female backing dancers who created silhouettes of themselves on the backing screens. The LED screens in the background showed flames and lava, with red light pouring onto the stage.

Next on stage was the Thorleifs with "Sweet Kissin' in the Moonlight", a nostalgic rock/pop/schlager entry. The band were dressed in matching white suits, with the lead singer in black. The five-piece band were later joined by three backing dancers in 1950s clothing, with red polka dot dresses and red braces. Sarah Dawn Finer followed with "Moving On", dressed in red. The performance began with a sunrise being shown on the LED screens, with wind machines introduced at the chorus. Two male backing dancers in white joined afterwards, followed by three female backing singers, also in white. Finer was then raised by an automatic lift towards the side of the stage. The penultimate act was boyband Next 3 with "Esta noche", sung in Swedish, with the chorus in Spanish. The trio were joined by three female backing dancers and two fire jugglers for their performance, while the screens showed urban scenes. The final act was wild card Malena Ernman with opera song "La Voix", performed in English and French during the chorus. Ernman, dressed in a long black dress, was joined by seven backing dancers in black and white, who performed with black shining masks towards the end. the backing screens and floor were coloured in solid colours, with green and purple in the verses and white and blue during the chorus.

Next 3, Anna Sahlene & Maria Haukaas Storeng and Susanne Alfvengren were knocked out after the first round of televoting, receiving the fewest votes. They were joined by the Thorleifs who received the fewest votes during the second round. The remaining four acts passed to the duels.

The Star Pilots and Agnes battled for a place in the final, with Agnes winning over the pilots. Malena Ernman and Sarah Dawn Finer also battled for the last direct place in the final, which was won by Ernman.

A total of 639,928 televotes were cast during the final heat, with a total of 1,122,841.50kr donated to the Radiohjälpen appeal.

 Second round (Duels) 

Second Chance

The Andra Chansen heat was held on 7 March at the Himmelstalundshallen in Norrköping. Eight songs competed for a second chance to reach the final, featuring the losing songs from the knockout rounds in the previous four heats.

For the first round eight songs battled to progress to the second round. The Scotts from heat 1 and Sarah Dawn Finer from heat 4 were the first songs to battle – the winner was Sarah Dawn Finer with "Moving On". Heat 2's Lili & Susie and heat 3's BWO were the next duo to battle each other – Lili & Susie edged ahead of BWO to progress to the next round. Amy Diamond and the Star Pilots battled against each other, with the Star Pilots coming out on top, while Rigo & The Topaz Sound feat. Red Fox competed against Caroline af Ugglas, with af Ugglas progressing.

The second round decided the two Second Chance qualifiers for the final: Lili & Susie battled against Sarah Dawn Finer, while the Star Pilots competed against Caroline af Ugglas. The final winners of Second Chance were Sarah Dawn Finer with "Moving On", and Caroline af Ugglas with "Snälla, snälla".

In total 939,222 votes were cast for the Second Chance round.

International Jury Wildcard
The international jury had the task of selecting a song from each heat which they think was the most suitable for the Eurovision Song Contest. The jury were only able to pick songs that had not passed to the final. If they pick a song which qualifies to the final through the Second Chance round, that song became ineligible for the jury's choice. The international jury were also given the right to vote during the final of the contest, becoming the 12th jury, alongside the 11 regional juries.

The first song to receive the international jury wildcard was Caroline af Ugglas, who passed to Second Chance from the Gothenburg heat on 7 February with "Snälla, snälla". Amy Diamond was the second qualifier, however, shortly after the show it was rumoured that the announcement of Diamond as the jury choice was incorrect, and that the true choice was Jennifer Brown, who had placed 7th in the televote. This rumour however was revealed to be false by SVT, with Diamond as the correct choice.

The Leksand wildcard selected was Sofia with "Alla". This song was the only jury wildcard selected that failed to qualify to Second Chance, coming 7th in the televote. The final wildcard, coming from the Malmö qualifier, was Sarah Dawn Finer with "Moving On", another Second Chance qualifier.

As Sarah Dawn Finer and Caroline af Ugglas had qualified from the Second Chance round to the final this made them ineligible to be chosen for the international jury qualifier. This left two songs left to compete for the 11th final place: either Amy Diamond, who had already been knocked out of Second Chance in the first round, or Sofia. The final choice by the jury was for Sofia with "Alla".

 Members of the International Jury 

Bruno Berberes (France) - President - Head of the French Eurovision delegation
Natalia Brasnuev (Moldova) - President of OGAE Moldova
Fred Bronson (United States) - Musical journalist/writer
Alessandro Capicchioni (San Marino) - TV program editor, Head of Delegation for San Marino
Damir Perić (Serbia) - ESC fan
Thomas Lundin (Finland) - TV presenter, singer
Yurii Nikitin (Ukraine) - Music company director
Alexandros Panayi (Cyprus) - Singer
Marija Šerifović (Serbia) - Singer, winner of ESC 2007
Maryna Skomorokhova (Ukraine) - Senior Account Manager for CFC, Ukraine's Eurovision sponsor
Anastasiya Tihanovich (Belarus) - Singer, executive producer of EuroFest 2009
Barry Viniker (United Kingdom) - Marketing and communications, managing director of esctoday.com

Jury Selections

Final
The final of Melodifestivalen 2009 was held at the Globen arena in Stockholm on 14 March 2009.

The run-up to the final began shortly after the Second Chance round had been completed, when the running order for the final was revealed – heat 2 qualifier Måns Zelmerlöw would open proceeding on the night, while heat 4 qualifier and wild card Malena Ernman would finish the performances for the evening.

The favourites to win the contest were Zelmerlöw and Ernman, with the international jury wild card Sofia predicted as most likely to finish last, according to bookmakers.

Måns Zelmerlöw took the stage first on the night, repeating his performance from the heat of "Hope & Glory". Second Chance qualifier Caroline af Ugglas followed Zelmerlöw on stage with "Snälla snälla", repeating her emotional performance alone on stage. Agnes was next on stage, performing "Love Love Love", now with a new hairstyle, but no major changes were made to the performance since the heat. H.E.A.T followed with their rock song "1000 Miles", who were then followed by Emilia with "You're My World".

Two-time participant Alcazar were the sixth act to take the stage at Globen, performing disco/pop number "Stay the Night", who were followed by the second Second Chance qualifier Sarah Dawn Finer, performing "Moving On". Boyband E.M.D., now performing in white tuxedos, were eighth on stage with "Baby Goodbye". International jury selection Sofia followed on stage, singing the Greek ethno number "Alla". She was followed by 16-year-old Molly Sandén with "Så vill stjärnorna", and finally by Malena Ernman with "La Voix".

 Voting 
The voting in the final was made up of both televoting/SMS voting and jury voting. 12 juries – 11 regional juries from around Sweden, along with the international jury – gave 1, 2, 4, 6, 8, 10 and 12 points to their favourite songs. This was joined by televoting, with the total votes being converted into a set number of points – 12, 24, 48, 72, 96, 120 and 144 points were given to the most-popular songs of the total televote from around Sweden.

The International jury results were announced immediately after all the entries were performed, while the televoting was still taking place. These results were announced on stage by Eurovision Song Contest 2007 winner and International Jury member Marija Šerifović.

Måns Zelmerlöw was the favourite with the juries, receiving a total of 96 points. Sarah Dawn Finer came second with the juries, gaining 75 points, while Alcazar came third with 67. However the televoting completely contradicted this, with the televoting favourite Malena Ernman coming only eighth in the jury vote, while runner-up Caroline af Ugglas came only 5th in the jury.

At the final vote Malena Ernman was the winner: despite only coming 8th in the jury vote, she was able to win the televote and guarantee victory with "La Voix". The runner-up was Caroline af Ugglas with "Snälla snälla", while E.M.D. came third with "Baby Goodbye". The winner of the jury vote was Måns Zelmerlöw with "Hope & Glory".

1,748,970 votes were received during the final, with a total of 3,457,434.50kr being donated to SVT's Radiohjälpen appeal. 3,592,000 people watched the final on SVT, however over 10 million watched the show live on SVT's online video on demand service SVT Play.

 Marcel Bezençon Awards 2009 

The Marcel Bezençon Awards honour the best competing songs in the final of Melodifestivalen. First awarded at the 2002 Eurovision Song Contest, they have been awarded at Melodifestivalen since 2005. The awards were founded by Christer Björkman (Sweden's representative in the 1992 Eurovision Song Contest and Melodifestivalen producer since 2002) and Richard Herrey (member of the Herreys, Eurovision Song Contest 1984 winner from Sweden), and are named after the creator of the Eurovision Song Contest, Marcel Bezençon. The awards are divided into 3 categories:Press Award - Given to the best entry as voted on by the accredited media and press during the event.Artistic Award -  Presented to the best artist as voted on by former winners of Melodifestivalen.Composer Award' - A jury consisting of the participating composers vote for the best and most original composition.

The 2009 Melodifestivalen awards were announced before the final of the contest:

The Press Award was given to Caroline af Ugglas with "Snälla snälla";
The Artistic Award was given to Sarah Dawn Finer with "Moving On";
And the Composer Award was awarded to Emilia Rydberg and Fredrik "Figge" Boström with "You're My World", performed by Emilia.

Chart success

A large number of songs from Melodifestivalen were able to chart in the Swedish singles chart – Sverigetopplistan – with two songs managing to peak at #1.

The first song to reach #1 in Sweden was Shirley Clamp's "Med hjärtat fyllt av ljus". The song, which was knocked out of the first heat, was released shortly afterwards, entering the charts on 20 February at #25. The song rose in the charts, and reached #1 on 6 March, the day before the Second Chance round.

The second song to reach #1 from Melodifestvalen was E.M.D.'s "Baby Goodbye". The song, released after the fourth heat per Melodifestivalen rules, entered at #3, before rising to #1 on 13 March, the day before the final, entering the final as #1. The song stayed at #1 for two weeks.

Four further songs peaked at #2 of the Sverigetopplistan, Alcazar's "Stay the Night", Caroline af Ugglas' "Snälla snälla", Måns Zelmerlöw's "Hope & Glory", and winner Malena Ernman with "La Voix". H.E.A.T and Sarah Dawn Finer peaked at #3 with "1000 Miles" and "Moving On" respectively,Sarah Dawn Finer - "Moving On" swedishcharts.com while Agnes peaked at #4 with "Love Love Love" and Star Pilots and Lili & Susie peaked at #6 with "Higher" and "Show Me Heaven".Lili & Susie - "Show Me Heaven" swedishcharts.com

Follow-up albums by many of the artists also did well in the Swedish albums chart: Måns Zelmerlöw's MZW, Sarah Dawn Finer's Moving On, Caroline af Ugglas' Så gör jag det igen, and Malena Ernman's La Voix Du Nord'' all peaked at #1.

See also
Melodifestivalen
Eurovision Song Contest 2009
Sweden in the Eurovision Song Contest 2009

References

External links

 Official website
 Rules for Melodifestivalen 2009

2009 Swedish television seasons
2009
2009 in Swedish music
2009 song contests
February 2009 events in Europe
March 2009 events in Europe
2000s in Stockholm
2000s in Gothenburg
Events in Stockholm
Events in Gothenburg
Events in Norrköping
Events at Malmö Arena
Events in Skellefteå
Events in Leksand